Baljci may refer to:

 Baljci, Bileća, a village in Bosnia and Herzegovina
 Baljci, Ružić, a village in Croatia
 Baljci, Tomislavgrad, a village in Bosnia and Herzegovina